Marino Morettini (2 January 1931 – 10 December 1990) was a road bicycle and track cyclist from Italy, who won the silver medal in the men's 1.000m time trial at the 1952 Summer Olympics. At the same Olympic tournament he claimed the gold medal in the men's 4.000m team pursuit,  alongside Loris Campana, Mino De Rossi and Guido Messina. He was a professional rider from 1954 to 1963.

References

External links

1931 births
1990 deaths
Italian track cyclists
Italian male cyclists
Cyclists at the 1952 Summer Olympics
Olympic cyclists of Italy
Olympic gold medalists for Italy
Olympic silver medalists for Italy
Cyclists from the Province of Bergamo
Olympic medalists in cycling
Medalists at the 1952 Summer Olympics